Ribes spicatum, the downy currant or Nordic currant, is a species in the genus Ribes, native to northern Europe and northern Asia. Its bright red berries are edible and quite goodtasting. It can be differentiated from the more common redcurrant (Ribes rubrum) not so much by its leaf hairs, as these tend to fall off as the leaf ages, but by other characteristics: the leaves of R.spicatum are a duller and darker green than R.rubrum with its paler yellowishgreen leaves. R.spicatum holds its leaves at a right angle to the stem, whereas R.rubrum leaves are less erect, markedly distinguishing the overall form of the bushes. R.spicatum has green petioles, but R.rubrum petioles are more orangeish.

Subspecies
The following subspecies is currently accepted:

Ribes spicatum subsp. hispidulum (Janch.) L.Hämet-Ahti

References

spicatum
Plants described in 1796